"Birthday Sex" is the debut single by American singer Jeremih. It is the lead single from his debut studio album, Jeremih (2009). The song was written by Jeremih, Elliot Prince, and Keith James and produced by Mick Schultz. "Birthday Sex" peaked at number four on the Billboard Hot 100 and topped the Hot R&B/Hip-Hop Songs chart. The single has been certified 3× Platinum.

Background
Jeremih wrote and recorded "Birthday Sex" in September 2008, initially calling it "Birthday Text" but later revising the name. Initially, a song entitled "My Ride" was scheduled to be released as the first single. Jeremih credited deejay Bam of Chicago's Power 92 for selecting "Birthday Sex" for radio play. The song is based on his own birthday experience. He thought that "someone would've written a song like that already—one that caters to females on their day". Meanwhile, during his first international press interview, Jeremih told noted UK R&B writer Pete Lewis of 'Blues & Soul': "I do think the lyrical concept really did help the song out! To where I feel it's gonna be a timeless record that'll still be played YEARS from now – simply because it's become a new birthday anthem!"

iSouth Remix
The official remix, "Birthday Sex (iSouth Remix)", features Pitbull, Trey Songz, Teairra Mari, Stat Quo, and Ludacris. The track was arranged by the record production duo iSouth Entertainment consisting of JB and Drunk D.

Music video

The music video for "Birthday Sex" was filmed in Los Angeles, California, and was directed by Paul Hunter. In the video, Jeremih is shown with his love interest, Brazilian model Alessandra Cardoso with a Handycam to capture their intimate moments. He proceeds to feed her fruit and desserts while she is blindfolded.

The music video managed to appear at number 3 on BET's Notarized: Top 100 Videos of 2009 countdown.

Critical reception
"Birthday Sex" has received generally favorable reviews from critics. Jon Caramanica of The New York Times called it a "fantastic single", while comparing it to songs by R. Kelly, as it "clips his lines short like a rapper and writes bedroom songs that verge on parody". Amos Barshad of New York magazine dubbed the song a "summer jam". According to Sean Ross of Edison Media Research, the title of the song generated its success.

Chart performance
"Birthday Sex" debuted on the Billboard Hot R&B/Hip-Hop Songs chart at number 93 for the week of March 21, 2009. In May 2009, the song topped the Billboard Mainstream R&B/Hip-Hop chart after ascending from number five to number one, the greatest rise for a new artist since Tweet's "Oops (Oh My)" in 2002. "Birthday Sex" displaced Jamie Foxx's "Blame It" from its 12-week streak atop the chart. "Birthday Sex" also displaced "Blame It" from its 14-week reign atop the Hot R&B/Hip-Hop Songs chart. For the week of May 14, 2009, "Birthday Sex" became the first song in several years outside of the top 10 of the Billboard Hot 100 to simultaneously have the greatest airplay gain and digital download gain. The song peaked at number four on the Billboard Hot 100.

Charts

Weekly charts

Year-end charts

Certifications

References

External links
 

2009 debut singles
2009 songs
Jeremih songs
Songs about birthdays
Def Jam Recordings singles
Songs written by Jeremih
Songs written by Mick Schultz
Music videos directed by Paul Hunter (director)